Lennon is a four-CD box set compilation, featuring highlights from the solo musical career of John Lennon. It was released in 1990 and is not to be confused with the 2015 box set of the same name, which comprised Lennon's eight original studio albums on vinyl LPs.

Compiled by Beatles historian Mark Lewisohn, Lennon includes his entire 1970 debut album Plastic Ono Band, selected tracks from his albums from Live Peace in Toronto 1969 through Menlove Ave., several non-album singles, live performances and other rarities.

Lennon never charted in the United Kingdom or United States and was deleted from Lennon's catalogue in the late 1990s.

Track listing
All songs composed by John Lennon, except where noted.

Disc one
"Give Peace a Chance" – 4:53
 Originally credited to Lennon–McCartney, the credit was revised in the 1990s to accurately reflect the fact that Lennon was the song's sole composer
"Blue Suede Shoes" (Carl Perkins) – 2:38
"Money" (Bradford-Berry Gordy) – 3:25
"Dizzy, Miss Lizzy" (Larry Williams) – 3:23
"Yer Blues" (Lennon/Paul McCartney) – 3:42
"Cold Turkey" – 5:02
"Instant Karma!" – 3:23
"Mother"– 5:35
"Hold On"– 1:53
"I Found Out" – 3:37
"Working Class Hero" – 3:50
"Isolation" – 2:53
"Remember"– 4:36
"Love" – 3:24
"Well Well Well" – 5:59
"Look at Me" – 2:54
"God" – 4:10
"My Mummy's Dead" – 0:53
"Power to the People" – 3:18
"Well (Baby Please Don't Go)" (Ward) – 3:56

Disc two
"Imagine" – 3:04
"Crippled Inside" – 3:49
"Jealous Guy" – 4:15
"It's So Hard" – 2:26
"Gimme Some Truth" – 3:16
"Oh My Love" (Lennon/Yoko Ono) – 2:45
"How Do You Sleep?" – 5:36
"How?" – 3:42
"Oh Yoko!" – 4:19
"Happy Xmas (War Is Over)" (Ono/Lennon) – 3:34
"Woman Is the Nigger of the World" (Lennon/Ono) – 5:15
"New York City" – 4:29
"John Sinclair" – 3:28
"Come Together" (Lennon–McCartney) – 4:25
"Hound Dog" (Jerry Leiber/Mike Stoller) – 3:02
"Mind Games" – 4:12
"Aisumasen (I'm Sorry)" – 4:44
"One Day (At a Time)" – 3:07
"Intuition" – 3:09
"Out the Blue" – 3:21

Disc three
"Whatever Gets You Thru the Night" – 3:25
"Going Down on Love" – 3:54
"Old Dirt Road" (Lennon/Harry Nilsson) – 4:09
"Bless You" – 4:37
"Scared" – 4:39
"#9 Dream" – 4:48
"Surprise, Surprise (Sweet Bird of Paradox)" – 2:55
"Steel and Glass" – 4:37
"Nobody Loves You (When You're Down and Out)" – 5:10
"Stand by Me" (Ben E. King/Leiber/Stoller) – 3:28
"Ain't That a Shame" (Fats Domino/Bartholomew) – 2:30
"Do You Wanna Dance" (Bobby Freeman) – 2:52
"Sweet Little Sixteen" (Chuck Berry) – 3:00
"Slippin' and Slidin'" (Penniman/Bocage/Collins/Smith) – 2:16
"Angel Baby" (Hamlin) – 3:39
"Just Because" (Lloyd Price) – 4:25
"Whatever Gets You Thru the Night (Live)" – 4:19
"Lucy in the Sky with Diamonds" (Lennon–McCartney) – 5:58
"I Saw Her Standing There" (Lennon–McCartney) – 3:28
 Tracks 17-19 recorded live at Elton John's Madison Square Garden show on 28 November 1974

Disc four
"(Just Like) Starting Over" – 3:56
"Cleanup Time" – 2:57
"I'm Losing You" – 3:56
"Beautiful Boy (Darling Boy)" – 4:01
"Watching the Wheels" – 3:31
"Woman" – 3:32
"Dear Yoko" – 2:33
"I'm Stepping Out" – 4:06
"I Don't Wanna Face It" – 3:21
"Nobody Told Me" – 3:33
"Borrowed Time" – 4:28
"(Forgive Me) My Little Flower Princess" – 2:27
"Every Man Has a Woman Who Loves Him" (Ono) – 3:31
 Originally released on Double Fantasy with Ono on lead vocals and Lennon on backing vocals, this remix features solo vocals from Lennon and was first released in 1984
"Grow Old with Me" – 3:07

Charts

Weekly charts

Certifications

References

Albums produced by Jack Douglas (record producer)
Compilation albums published posthumously
John Lennon compilation albums
1990 compilation albums
Capitol Records compilation albums
Parlophone compilation albums